Tim Lombard (born 17 February 1976) is an Irish Fine Gael politician who has served as a Senator for the Agricultural Panel since April 2016.

He was a member of Cork County Council from 2009 to 2016. He was Mayor of County Cork from 2011 to 2012, being the then youngest ever mayor.

He is the Fine Gael Seanad spokesperson on Communications, Climate Action and the Environment. He was an unsuccessful candidate for the Cork South-West constituency at the 2020 general election.

References

External links
Tim Lombard's page on the Fine Gael website

1976 births
Living people
Fine Gael senators
Politicians from County Cork
Members of the 25th Seanad
Members of the 26th Seanad
Local councillors in County Cork